The 1884 French Military Mission to Japan was the third French military mission to that country and consisted of five men.

It followed two earlier missions, the first French Military Mission to Japan (1867-1868), and the second French Military Mission to Japan (1872-1880), which had a considerable role in shaping the new Imperial Japanese Army.

From 1886 to 1889, Japan also invited two German officers (particularly Jakob Meckel) in parallel to the French Mission, who were influents in the Army General Staff reform.

France would gain considerable influence with the Imperial Japanese Navy instead, with the dispatch of the engineer Louis-Émile Bertin.

References
"Sabre et pinceau", Christian Polak, Chambre de Commerce et d'Industrie Française du Japon.
"Ambassadeur au Pays du Soleil Levant dans l'ancien Empire du Japon", Hervé Bernard, autoédition Biarritz 2007, 266 pages en quadrichromie.
"L'ingénieur général du génie maritime Louis, Emile Bertin 1840-1924 créateur de la marine japonaise à l'époque de Meiji Tenno", Hervé Bernard, autoédition Biarritz 2007, 84 pages en quadrichromie. 

French Army
Military history of Japan
1884 in military history
Military Mission 1884
1880s in France
1880s in Japan
Military history of France